Iskayuni (Aymara iskayu headdress, -ni a suffix, "the one with the headdress", also spelled Escayuni) is a mountain in the Bolivian Andes which reaches a height of approximately . It is located in the La Paz Department, Inquisivi Province, Quime Municipality. Iskayuni lies northeast of Wisk'achani.

References 

Mountains of La Paz Department (Bolivia)